Ischnoptera deropeltiformis, the dark wood roach,  is a species of wood cockroach (family Ectobiidae) native to the United States.

Additional images

References

 

Cockroaches
Insects described in 1865
Taxa named by Carl Brunner von Wattenwyl